Chance Rides Manufacturing is a roller coaster and amusement ride manufacturer. The company was formed on May 16, 2002, when the former Chance Industries Inc. emerged from bankruptcy. The main office and manufacturing facility are located in Wichita, Kansas.

History

Chance Manufacturing was incorporated in 1961 by Richard H. (Harold) Chance. Harold Chance had been involved in the amusement business since 1946, building small trains for the Ottaway Amusement Company. He designed a  gauge replica of the C. P. Huntington, a well-known steam locomotive built in 1863 for the Southern Pacific Railroad. Titled by the same name, Chance's C. P. Huntington is the company's most successful product line. In 1967, Chance began producing Starliner Trams under the subsidiary Chance Coach. In 1970, Chance acquired the assets of the Allan Herschell Company. Richard G. Chance (Dick Chance) assumed control of the company and formed Chance Industries, Inc. in 1985 to oversee the various divisions – Chance Rides, Chance Coach, and Chance Operations. In December 1986, Chance then acquired Bradley & Kaye, a ride manufacturer specialized in children's rides and carousel figures.

Modern era
For several years, Chance Rides Manufacturing products were sold under the brand Chance Morgan. In 2011, the company reintroduced the Chance Rides brand which encompasses Chance Morgan Coasters, Inc. and Chance Rides Manufacturing. On September 17, 2011, trade publication Amusement Today presented Chance Rides with the Golden Ticket Award for Supplier of the Year, in honor of the company's 50th anniversary.

Trains

Chance Rides began to fabricate their  narrow gauge C. P. Huntington locomotive in 1960. Since 2018, these locomotives can be powered by a gasoline, diesel, propane, or electric engine. Its drive wheels are not powered, but roll on the rails while fake side rods reciprocate in and out of fake cylinders. Power is instead provided by the front and rear trucks. Some owners have chosen to remove the false drive wheels for ease of maintenance.

With over 400 examples built as of 2022, the C. P. Huntington has become the most popular park train since The Allan Herschell Company merged into Chance Industries in 1970 and production of the S-24 Iron Horse train ceased. Locomotives and coaches can be customized in a variety of ways.

Carousels
Chance Carrousels (deliberately spelled with two "R"s) were introduced in 1971 following the acquisition of the Allan Herschell Company the previous year. Chance modified the Herschell design giving it a more ornate style. After Chance purchased Bradley & Kaye in December 1986, Chance was able to use the molds and manufacturing rights to 62 carousel figures produced by Bradley & Kaye owner, David Bradley. He had carefully reproduced prized carousel animals from famous carvers over the previous 20 years and new molds were cast at the Chance facility under his direction, until Bradley died in 1988. These famous reproductions with spectacular detail have been included on Chance carrousels since the late 1980s. With the merger of the D. H. Morgan line of carousels, some of the unique Morgan figures have been added to the collection as well. Although fiberglass, the magnificent detail and menagerie of different styles of horses and other figures have become a trademark of Chance Rides carrousels.

Ferris wheels

The first Ferris wheel from Chance, the Astro Wheel, was sold to showman Don Franklin and debuted at the 1967 Iowa State Fair. It featured 16 cars with two passengers per car. The first park model, an 80-foot Giant Wheel, was built in 1975 at Valleyfair amusement park in Minnesota. It features 18 cars holding four passengers per car and is still in operation. The Giant Wheel/Century Wheel was introduced in various sizes in both park and portable models in 1988.

It features 42 air-conditioned cars seating eight passengers per car. According to Chance Rides director Angus Jenkins, the larger wheels are known as observation wheels as opposed to Ferris wheels, since they carry riders in enclosed cars rather than in open seats.

On October 19, 2012, Chance Rides announced a long term license agreement with Bussink Design GmbH for the exclusive rights to manufacture and sell the R80XL Giant Wheel in North America. The first R80XL wheel was manufactured by Maurer German Wheels in Munich, Germany, and was delivered to the city early in 2013. The first U.S. version built by Chance was the Capital Wheel at the National Harbor, Md. It opened May 23, 2014. Chance Rides/Chance American Wheels will continue to manufacturer and sell R60 wheels in North America under an exclusive license from Dutch Wheels BV.

Notable wheels include:
The Great Escape Giant Wheel (1989)
It was the world's tallest indoor wheel when it opened.
Hersheypark Ferris wheel (1996)
Clementon Amusement Park Giant Ferris Wheel (1997)
Niagara SkyWheel (2006)
Myrtle Beach SkyWheel (2011)
Seattle Great Wheel (2012)
Capital Wheel (2014)

Roller coasters
Chance Manufacturing's first coaster was the Toboggan, a portable ride in which a small vehicle climbed vertically up a tower then spiraled back down around the same tower. The ride was invented by Walter House of Amarillo, Texas, and Chance acquired the manufacturing rights and started producing it in 1969. It was designed to be a carnival ride, fitting on two trailers, but several units were purchased by amusement parks where they were set up as permanent attractions. Chance manufactured 32 of these units, two of which still operate at a permanent park. In 1998 Chance introduced the Big Dipper children's coaster. With the integration of the D. H. Morgan line into Chance Rides in 2001, the company acquired track manufacturing technology and the ability to offer a variety of coaster designs. D. H. Morgan was an offshoot of Arrow Development, original developer of tubular steel track, first used on Disney's Matterhorn Bobsleds attraction. In 2006, Chance formed an alliance with Vekoma. Chance Rides represented Vekoma in North America and manufactured the steel track for select projects. On October 17, 2012 Chance Rides and Vekoma discontinued their agreement to produce rides together for the North American market.

List of roller coasters

As of 2019, Chance Rides has built 36 roller coasters around the world.

Current models

  Carrousel
  Carrousel
   Double Decker Carrousel
   Carrousel
  Double Decker Carrousel
  Grand Carrousel
Aviator
C.P. Huntington replica  narrow gauge miniature train
Century Wheel
DGW35 Gondola Wheel 
DGW45 Gondola Wheel 
Electric Cars
Family Coaster
Freestyle
Giant Wheel
Hypercoasters  Mamba, World's of Fun 
Hyper GT-X Coaster Lightning Run, Kentucky Kingdom
Pharaoh's Fury
GXL200*  Observation Wheel
R60 Giant Wheel
R80XL Giant Wheel
Revolution 20
Revolution 32
Tramstar HD
Tramstar LFT
UniCoaster
 Unicoaster 2.0
Wipeout
Yo Yo
Zipper

Past models

Alpine Bobs (also available in Rock and Roll/Swingin' Safari/Thunder Bolt themes)
Astro Wheel 
Casino (variation of the Trabant)
Chaos 
Falling Star
Flying Bobs (originally by Herschell)/Thunderbolt (rethemed Bobs)
Inverter 
Music Fest (variation of the Flying Bobs) 
Observation Tower
Olympia Bobs (originally by Herschell)
Pump-It Handcar
Radar
Rok-N-Rol (originally by Herschell)
Rotor
Sea Dragon (predecessor to the Pharaoh's Fury)
Sidewheeler
Skydiver
Sky Wheel (originally by Herschell)
Slingshot 
Space Shuttle
Star Fighter
Suspended Family Coaster
Toboggan
Trabant
Tumbler (a lifting, double-wheel version of the Skydiver- was known as Wheel Barrow.  Only one built)
Turbo
Twister
Wagon Wheel (variation of the Trabant)
Wagon Wheeler
The Zipper
Zumur

References

External links
 
 Chance Rides listing at Roller Coaster DataBase

Amusement ride manufacturers
Roller coaster manufacturers
Companies based in Wichita, Kansas
Tram manufacturers
Companies that filed for Chapter 11 bankruptcy in 2001
Rolling stock manufacturers of the United States
Amusement rides manufactured by Chance Rides
Roller coasters manufactured by Chance Rides
Carousels

fr:Chance Morgan